Thai fisherman pants are lightweight unisex trousers that are made wide in the waist so that one size fits all. The pants are wrapped around the waist and ribbons are tied to form a belt. Excess material is then folded over the knot.

Thai fisherman pants are very similar to the traditional attire of Intha and Shan males, the former of whom live on Inle Lake of Myanmar. They are known in Burmese as shan baung-mi.

Uses 

Although traditionally used by fishermen in Thailand, they have become popular among others for casual, beach, and exercise wear as well as for backpacking and pregnancy. Traditionally, Thai fisherman pants were adapted from sarongs and were worn by Thai fishermen and farmers. This style of pants suits the tropical climate of Thailand well as they are light and airy, inexpensive to produce, quick drying, secure, and comfortable.

Thai fishermen do in reality wear this style of pants. They are also increasingly common among many men and women of all nationalities. This style of trousers is usually made of cotton or rayon but is also now widely available in a variety of styles and fabrics, such as hemp, bamboo, or linen.

References

Burmese clothing
Thai clothing
Trousers and shorts